Johann Heinrich Fixsen (19 October 1825 in St. Petersburg – 4 September 1899 in Hamburg) was a German entomologist who specialized in the Lepidoptera of the Palaearctic Region.

He wrote Lepidopteren-Verzeichniss der Umgegend von St. Petersburg (In Bull Moscou 22(1)) 1849 and many other scientific works describing new species.
His collection is in the Biozentrum Grindel und Zoologisches Museum.

References

German lepidopterists
1825 births
1899 deaths
Scientists from Saint Petersburg
19th-century German zoologists